Ferromanganese nodules (FMN) form in the oxidizing environment of the abyssal pelagic zone.  The formation mechanism involves a series of redox oscillations driven by both abiotic and biotic processes. As a byproduct of pedogenesis, the specific composition of a FMN is dependent on the composition of the surrounding soil in which it is formed. The composition of manganese-bearing minerals is dependent on how the nodules are formed; sedimentary nodules, which have a lower Mn2+ content than diagenetic, are dominated by Fe-vernadite, Mn-feroxyhyte, and asbolane-buserite while diagenetic nodules are dominated by buserite I, birnessite, todorokite, and asbolane-buserite.

See also 
 Manganese nodule

References 

Cobalt minerals
Copper minerals
Manganese minerals
Natural resources
Nickel minerals
Oceanography
Underwater mining